Thomas Norton Hart (January 20, 1829 – October 4, 1927) was an American manufacturer,  businessman,  and politician from Massachusetts who served as Mayor of Boston from 1889 to 1890 and from 1900 to 1902.

See also
 Timeline of Boston, 1880s-1900s

References 

 Thomas Norton Hart, Mayor of Boston, Boston, MA:  Forest Hills Educational Trust (January 23, 2010). Visited July 4, 2011.
 Image from Mayors of Boston: An Illustrated Epitome of who the Mayors Have Been and What they Have Done, Boston, MA: State Street Trust Company, Page 40, (1914).

References

Further reading

External links
 Forest Hills Educational Trust information on Thomas N. Hart
 Political Graveyard information on Thomas N. Hart

1829 births
1927 deaths
American Unitarians
Massachusetts Republicans
Mayors of Boston
Boston City Council members
People from North Reading, Massachusetts